Wiggin is a surname, and may refer to

Albert H. Wiggin (1868–1951), American banker
Alfred J. Wiggin (1823–1883), American artist
Rt. Hon. Andrew Wiggin (1671–1756), American colonial period judge
Bill Wiggin (born 1966), British politician
Sir Charles Wiggin (1922–1977), British diplomat, ambassador to Spain
Charles Wiggin (rower) (born 1950), British rower
Frances Turgeon Wiggin (1891-1985), American author and composer
Sir Henry Wiggin (1824–1905), British metals manufacturer and politician
James Henry Wiggin (1836-1900), American Unitarian minister and editor
Sir Jerry Wiggin (Alfred William Wiggin, 1937-2015), British Conservative Party politician
Kate Douglas Wiggin (1856–1923), American children's author
Maurice Wiggin, English journalist
Paul Wiggin (born 1934), American football player
Samuel Adams Wiggin (1832–1899), American poet and secretary to Presidents Johnson and Grant
Thomas Wiggin (1592–1667), early governor in New Hampshire
Tom Wiggin (born 1955), American actor, writer and entrepreneur
Wiggin baronets

Fictional characters from the Ender's Game series:
Ender Wiggin
John Paul Wiggin
Peter Wiggin
Theresa Wiggin
Valentine Wiggin

See also
 Wiggins (surname)